Paris Métro Line 11 (French: Ligne 11 du métro de Paris) is one of the sixteen lines of the Paris Métro. It links Châtelet to Mairie des Lilas in the northeastern suburbs. At a length of 6.3 km (3.9 mi) and 13 stations served, it is currently the shortest of the 14 main Métro lines (excluding Line 3bis and Line 7bis) but is being extended by 6 stations. With 47.1 million riders in 2017, it is the thirteenth busiest line of the network.

Unlike most Paris Métro lines, Line 11 was not included in the original late 19th century scheme. Designed to replace the former Belleville funicular tramway, it was opened in 1935 and intended to create a more effective transportation system which could handle the increasing traffic on the route, as well as to extend it to the center of Paris.

An extension from Mairie des Lilas to Rosny-Bois-Perrier station is currently being built; featuring 6 stations, it will be opened in 2024. The rolling stock of the line is also being replaced with new MP 14 trains.

Chronology
29 December 1922: Paris council voted for the creation of a new metro line which would replace the Belleville funicular and which would be extended to Châtelet.
28 April 1935: Line 11 was inaugurated from Châtelet to Porte des Lilas.
17 February 1937: The line was extended from Porte des Lilas to Mairie des Lilas.
8 November 1956: Due to steep slopes, the rails were adapted to allow for rubber-tyred trains.

Rolling stock

Being the first metro line to be converted to rubber-tyred pneumatic operation, the first set of rubber-tyred rolling stock to be in service on Line 11 was the MP 55, which operated from October 1956 through January 1999. They were then replaced by refurbished MP 59 stock from Line 4. The MP 55 stock consisted of 4 carriages, as well as the current MP 59 stock. One MP 73 of line 6 is in service on the 11 as well.

The current plan, according to Île-de-France Mobilités, is to replace the current fleet of Line 11 with the  series, around the time when the extension to Rosny-sous-Bois opens. Although the new trains will be driver-operated in the same method as the current fleet, they will be 5 cars long, and have open gangways.

An initial 20 trains was ordered in February 2018 with an additional 19 trains ordered in July 2021. Production began in late 2020, with testing in summer 2021.

Future
 A six-station,  extension eastbound from Mairie des Lilas to Rosny-sous-Bois is under construction to ensure better commuter service to the Northeastern inner suburbs.
 The scheme was first proposed by the local government authorities, and adopted during the 2007 review of the Ile-de-France Transportation Plan.
 Preliminary work on this extension to Rosny – Bois-Perrier started in 2015. It is expected to open by 2024.
 The extension will provide new connections with the RER E and the extended tramway line 1, which will be linked more easily to the downtown and the commuter hub of Châtelet les Halles.

Revisions in the Grand Paris Express Plan and possible automation

A revised plan for the proposed Grand Paris Express metro system was unveiled on 6 March 2013. The revisions call for a second extension of Line 11 towards Noisy-Champs by 2030, although it is unclear if this goal will be attainable. Should the second extension commence, it is slated to come with a full automation of Line 11. Automation is currently not planned for the Rosny extension, though the RATP and STIF had considered the possibility of automating the line later on.

Route

Tourism
Metro line 11 passes near several places of interest :
The Hôtel de Ville (City Hall) of Paris.
The Centre Georges Pompidou accommodating the Paris Museum of Modern Art.
The Conservatoire National des Arts et Métiers (engineering school).
The popular quarter of Belleville, hosting one of Paris' "Chinatowns" and centres of other Asian cultures.

See also

References

External links

  RATP official website
 RATP english speaking website
 Interactive Map of the RER (from RATP's website)
 Interactive Map of the Paris métro (from RATP's website)
  Mobidf website, dedicated to the RER (unofficial)
  Metro-Pole website, dedicated to Paris public transports (unofficial)
  Line extension project

 
Railway lines opened in 1935